OVN, or Open Virtual Network, is a system to support virtual network abstraction.

OVN may also refer to:

 Open value network, a new organizational framework